Vitex zanzibarensis is a species of plant in the family Lamiaceae. It is found in Kenya and Tanzania. It is threatened by habitat loss.

References

zanzibarensis
Flora of Kenya
Flora of Tanzania
Vulnerable plants
Taxonomy articles created by Polbot